Saint-Césaire is a city in the Canadian province of Quebec, located within the Rouville Regional County Municipality in the province's Montérégie region. The population as of the Canada 2011 Census was 5,686.

Demographics 

Population trend:

(+) Amalgamation of the merger of the City and the Parish of Saint-Césaire on January 26, 2000.

Mother tongue language (2006)

See also
List of cities in Quebec
Municipal history of Quebec

References

External links

Saint-Césaire official website

Cities and towns in Quebec
Incorporated places in Rouville Regional County Municipality
Canada geography articles needing translation from French Wikipedia